Shadi Cecily Stoute (born 26 October 1999), known as Cecily Stoute, is an American-born Trinidad and Tobago footballer who plays as a defender for Georgia Lady Bulldogs and the Trinidad and Tobago women's national team.

College career
Stoute attends the University of Georgia since 2018. In 2022, Stoute was named an Arthur Ashe, Jr. Sports Scholar by Diverse: Issues In Higher Education.

International career
Stoute represented Trinidad and Tobago at the 2018 CONCACAF Women's U-20 Championship. She made her senior debut in 2018.

References

1999 births
Living people
Women's association football defenders
Trinidad and Tobago women's footballers
Trinidad and Tobago women's international footballers
American women's soccer players
Soccer players from Atlanta
Georgia Bulldogs women's soccer players